Kenny Yap Kim Lee, popularly known as “Kenny the Fish”, is the executive chairman of Qian Hu Corporation, an ornamental fish specialist company founded in Singapore.

Yap was conferred the Singapore Youth Award for Entrepreneurship in 1998. He also received Spring Singapore’s International Management Action Award 2000. He was named one of the 50 stars of Asia by Business Week in 2001, and went on to receive the Yazhou Zhoukan Young Chinese Entrepreneur Award 2002 and the Ernst & Young Services Entrepreneur Award 2003, among other accolades.

Education

Yap graduated with a Diploma in Mechanical Engineering from Singapore Polytechnic in 1985. He later graduated from Ohio State University with a 1st Class Honours degree in Business Administration.

Quote
 "We knew that we were small fish. Small fish have to swim together to survive. Without my four brothers and two cousins, I don’t think there would be a Kenny Yap." — Kenny Yap

References

External links
 Kenny Yap's E-book, The Rise of An Asian Entrepreneur
 Kenny Yap - Business Week review
 Kenny Yap's profile

Singaporean businesspeople
Singaporean people of Chinese descent
Hwa Chong Institution alumni
Singapore Polytechnic alumni
Living people
Ohio State University Fisher College of Business alumni
Year of birth missing (living people)